Mark Frazier is an American born artist, painter, body painter and photographer. His work has been seen in film, television, private collections and print.

Early life

Mark Frazier was born in West Covina, California on December 1, 1956 to Ralph and Doris Frazier. His father worked during the school year as a biology teacher and spent summers as a national park ranger taking the family to parks all over the western United States. His mother was an accomplished artist introducing him to the works of many California plein air painters and the late expressionist painter, LeRoy Neiman.

He attended Claremont McKenna College majoring in biochemistry but soon found his true passion in fine arts and eventually completed his studies at Cal Poly Pomona University. The works of Neiman and Roger Dean inspired Mark to change path and pursue a career in the Arts.

Career

Starting in the early 1980s Mark became known around Los Angeles and New York for painting photo realistic backgrounds for photography studios. This led to the chance encounter with the staff at Playboy Studio West and eventually Hugh Hefner where he was asked to figure out how to bodypaint realistic lingerie onto live models for Hef's exclusive events at the Playboy Mansion.

Mark Frazier officially began his body painting career in 1987.  He has worked as the bodypainter at every Playboy Party at the Playboy Mansion since the mid 1990s.

His paintings, body paintings and photographs have been seen in and on; A&E, Nat Geo, 20th Century FOX, NBC, Showtime, CBS, HBO, Fox Television Studios, Alta Loma Entertainment, Prometheus Entertainment, Evolution Media, MTV, E!, WE, KLOS, Entourage, Biography, History Channel, A Band Apart Productions, Cosmopolitan Magazine, Kandy Magazine, Black Men's Magazine, Quentin Tarantino, Playboy Magazine, Playboy.com, Playboy Special Editions, Playboy Mexico, Playboy Czech, Playboy Slovakia, Playboy Radio, Playboy Home Video, The Girls Next Door, Kendra on Top, Botched (tv series), Yard Barker, Badger Airbrush, Ben Nye Makeup, Benchwarmer, Sunset Tan, The Tom Leykis Show, Gay Pride LA, The Dinah, The Adam Carolla Show, Miller Beer, Budweiser, Daren Metropoulos, Papst Blue Ribbon, Colt 45, Bacardi, Nike, Coca-Cola, Red Bull, Sol Cerveza, Mandalay Bay, Hard Rock Hotel and Casino, The Palms Casino Resort, The Playboy Club, Diana Ross, Southern California Edison, Edison International, Reef Brazil, Football Hall of Fame, Cartoon Network, LA Weekly, The Los Angeles MOCA, Arron Carter, Snoop Lion (Dogg), Wil Smith, and Greenlaw Partners.

Mark worked for years with legendary photographers Stephen Wayda of Playboy and the inventive Jack Eadon developing his own style and techniques of photography. After doing work for Hugh Hefner's personal collection which included paintings and photographs, Hef (who had only trusted film cameras up to this point) selected him to do the first digital photography for Playboy magazine shooting the October 2001 issue of the magazine and then many featured pictorials. Hef’s nickname for Mark “the  Wizard” stuck around the Playboy organization and in turn The Hollywood crowd.

Mark's fine art paintings are currently on exhibit at various galleries and collections across the United States. His main gallery is in Laguna Beach CA

In 2007 Mark was listed as #46 in the Time Magazine Alt Most Influential People in the World List for his hand in creating the modern style and techniques in bodypainting and digital photography.

He is credited with discovering several well known personalities including reality TV star Kendra Wilkinson, and helping guide Madonna Ciccone's transition from The Breakfast Club (band) to a solo career as Emmy in the band Emmy and the Emmys and then Madonna.

Personal life

Mark is married to Susan Frazier. They have two grown children, Michael Frazier and Dr. Megan Frazier. All are accomplished artists; having worked on many high-profile art projects as a family and as individuals.

References

1956 births
Living people
American artists